Alisha Abdullah is an Indian racing driver. She is the country's first female national racing champion.

Racing
She started her racing career at the age of 9, when she started indoor Kart racing.

In 2016, she founded the Alisha Abdullah Racing Academy, through which she identifies talented racers to support.

In 2018, she was felicitated by President Ram Nath Kovind and the Minister of Women and Child Development, Maneka Sanjay Gandhi as the 'First Lady' to have embarked in the field of motorsports from India.

Personal life
In July 2020, she was appointed as the Tamil Nadu State Women President of the National Human Rights Anti Crime and Anti Corruption Bureau.

Her father RA Abdullah is also a famous bike racer and a seven-time national champion.

Politics
Abdullah joined the Tamil Nadu unit of the Bharatiya Janata Party in September 2022. After joining BJP, she stated that her goal is to become a Member of the parliament. 

She recommends Hindi as a compulsory language in Tamil Nadu.

Filmography

References

1989 births
Living people
Indian racing drivers
Sportswomen from Tamil Nadu
Motorsport people from Chennai
Female motorcycle racers
JK Tyre National Level Racing Championship drivers